Jicaque may refer to: 
The Jicaque people
One of the Jicaquean languages, especially
the Jicaque language